The third season of the American television comedy series The Goldbergs premiered on ABC on September 23, 2015. The season was produced by Adam F. Goldberg Productions, Happy Madison Productions, and Sony Pictures Television, and the executive producers are Adam F. Goldberg, Doug Robinson, and Seth Gordon.

The show explores the daily lives of the Goldberg family, a family living in Jenkintown, Pennsylvania in the 1980s. Beverly Goldberg (Wendi McLendon-Covey), the overprotective matriarch of the Goldbergs is married to Murray Goldberg (Jeff Garlin). They are the parents of three children, Erica (Hayley Orrantia), Barry (Troy Gentile), and Adam (Sean Giambrone).

ABC renewed The Goldbergs for its third season on May 7, 2015.

Cast

Main cast
 Wendi McLendon-Covey as Beverly Goldberg
 Sean Giambrone as Adam Goldberg
 Troy Gentile as Barry Goldberg
 Hayley Orrantia as Erica Goldberg
 AJ Michalka as Lainey Lewis
 George Segal as Albert "Pops" Solomon
 Jeff Garlin as Murray Goldberg

Episodes

Ratings

References

The Goldbergs (2013 TV series) seasons
2015 American television seasons
2016 American television seasons